The Museum of Contemporary Craft based in Portland, Oregon was the oldest continuously-running craft institution on the west coast of the United States until its closing in 2016.   Located in downtown Portland's Pearl District, the museum's mission was "to enliven and expand the understanding of craft and the museum experience."

History 
Lydia Herrick Hodge founded the Museum in 1937 with the support of a group of dedicated women volunteers, and using donated materials from the Works Progress Administration (WPA).  Originally called the Oregon Ceramic Studio, the studio building first opened in 1938.  Lydia Herrick Hodge led the OCC as the studio director  from 1937 until her death in 1960. Ken Shores became the first paid director in 1964, changing the name in 1965 from The Oregon Ceramic Studio to Contemporary Crafts Gallery to better reflect the breadth of work shown at the institution. The institution became known as Contemporary Crafts Museum & Gallery in 2002, and Museum of Contemporary Craft in 2007.

The museum housed a collection of over 1200 objects that document the active role of both the Museum and the Pacific Northwest in the evolution of craft over the past seven decades.

Partnership with PNCA 
In January 2009, the Museum of Contemporary Craft integrated with the Pacific Northwest College of Art (PNCA), making the joint institution one of the largest organizations devoted to the visual arts in the state of Oregon.

Closure / Dissolution 
PNCA announced in February 2016 that the museum would close, with the collection being transferred to a new Center for Contemporary Art and Culture at PNCA.

Location 
Museum of Contemporary Craft's first location, 3934 SW Corbett Avenue, was home to the museum for 70 years. The art deco style building was designed by architect Ellis Lawrence, first dean of the University of Oregon School of Architecture and Allied Arts. The building underwent several renovations, most notably in 1998 when the Marlene Gable Gallery was built, designed by Northwest Regional style architect William Fletcher. The Marlene Gable Gallery served as the permanent collection space.

In 2005, the museum board decided to move the museum's location. In July 2007, the museum relocated to its current location, 724 NW Davis Street, in the Historic DeSoto Building on Portland's North Park Blocks. As part of the grand opening at this location, Portland artist Tom Cramer was commissioned to paint an unofficial BMW Art Car.  The new location increased foot traffic and visibility for the museum, and was the site of many exhibitions that featured local, national and international artists.

References

External links
Museum of Contemporary Craft
Gallery Store at Museum of Contemporary Craft
Generation: Betty Feves

1937 establishments in Oregon
2016 disestablishments in Oregon
Art museums established in 1937
Art museums and galleries in Oregon
Contemporary crafts museums in the United States
Museums in Portland, Oregon
Pacific Northwest College of Art
Pearl District, Portland, Oregon
Works Progress Administration in Oregon